Northwest College Preparatory High School, sometimes referred to as Northwest or just NWCP, is a public high school in Rochester, New York. It is in the Rochester City School District.

History
In September 2007 the Northwest College Preparatory High School moved to the Fredrick Douglass Campus.

Sports
Northwest College Prep shares its athletic teams with the Northeast College Preparatory High School making the teams that are housed on the Douglass Campus.  Several of the Varsity Teams are combined with the Franklin Campus. The name of their sports team is the College Prep Panthers.

See also
Rochester City School District

External links
College Board Schools

Public high schools in New York (state)
High schools in Monroe County, New York
Public middle schools in New York (state)